Archibald le Magichien (literally: Archibald the Magic Dog) is a French animated edutainment TV series that ran from 1980 until 1981. A total of 46 5-minute episodes were produced by DiC Audiovisuel.

This miniseries was one of the first productions of DIC Entertainment (then known as DIC Audiovisuel), produced only one year before Ulysses 31.

Title
The last word in the title combines the words magie (magic) and chien (dog). The resulting portmanteau, magichien, is a pun on the word magicien (magician).

Synopsis
Archibald is a magician who has transformed himself into a dog and can't remember how to change himself back. He befriends a young boy called Pierrot and teaches him the secrets of maintaining a good form and health.

The series was designed to teach child viewers how to take better care of their health. Among its many educational values were: The dangers of using tobacco, alcohol, exposure to sun, and the importance of maintaining one's hygiene such as brushing one's teeth, exercising, washing one's hands and eating balanced meals.

Alternative titles
 נחשון (Nachshon) (Israeli title)
 De toverhond Archibald (Dutch title)

References

External links
 Archibald le Magichien on Planete Jeunesse
 Archibald le Magichien on AlloCiné

1980 French television series debuts
1981 French television series endings
1980s French animated television series
French children's animated education television series
Television series by DIC Entertainment
Television series by DHX Media
Television about magic